Matrix is the fourth extended play by South Korean boy group B.A.P.  It was released on November 16, 2015 by TS Entertainment and distributed by LOEN Entertainment. It features the lead single "Young, Wild & Free". It peaked at #3 on the Gaon charts.

Track listing

References

2015 EPs
B.A.P (South Korean band) EPs
Korean-language EPs
Kakao M EPs
TS Entertainment EPs